Cristian Bălașa (born 27 December 1972) is a Romanian professional football manager and former football player. He is currently the sporting director of Liga II club Concordia Chiajna.

Club career
Bălașa made his Liga I debut on 31 July 1996, for Chindia Târgoviște, in a 1–0 win against Ceahlăul Piatra Neamț. He also played for Argeș Pitești, Farul Constanța, FC Oradea and Concordia Chiajna before retiring in 2010.

In February 2018, Bălașa decided to play again for the team that he also managed, FC Aninoasa.

Managerial career
In 2012, Bălașa started his coaching career, managing lower league clubs such as AS Doiceşti, Concordia II Chiajna and Aninoasa, and was also Gheorghe Hagi's assistant coach at Viitorul Constanța for two seasons. From 2015 to 2016 he was the sporting director of Chindia Târgoviște.

Personal life
His son, Mihai Bălașa, is also a football player.

Honours

Player
Chindia Târgoviște
Divizia B: 1995–96

Concordia Chiajna
Liga III: 2006–07

References

External links
 

1972 births
Living people
People from Pucioasa
Romanian footballers
Association football midfielders
Liga I players
Liga II players
FCM Târgoviște players
FC Argeș Pitești players
FCV Farul Constanța players
FC Bihor Oradea players
CS Concordia Chiajna players
Romanian football managers